A Nightmare Wakes is a 2020 American psychological thriller film directed and written by Nora Unkel. The film stars Alix Wilton Regan, Giullian Yao Gioiello, Philippe Bowgen, Lee Garrett and Claire Glassford. It will premiere on Shudder on February 4, 2021.

Plot
Mary is a young writer whose story comes to life in horribly vivid hallucinations, causing her to question the relationships she maintains with the people she loves and the reality around her.

Cast
 Alix Wilton Regan as Mary Shelley
 Giullian Yao Gioiello as Percy Shelley
 Philippe Bowgen as Lord Byron
 Lee Garrett as Dr. John Polidori
 Claire Glassford as Claire Clairmont
 Shannon Spangler as Harriet Shelley
 Nicholas Freeland Clark as Party Goer

References

External links
 
 

2020 psychological thriller films
American psychological thriller films
2020s English-language films
2020s American films